Joel Farrell (born 15 March 1994) is a Jamaican professional rugby league footballer who plays as a  forward for the Sheffield Eagles in the Betfred Championship and Jamaica at international level.

Farrell is a Jamaican international. He has previously spent time on loan at the Gateshead Thunder in the Kingstone Press League 1 competition. In 2019 he helped the Eagles to win the inaugural 1895 Cup as they defeated Widnes Vikings 36–18 in the final; Farrell scored a try to level the game at 18–18.

He has also previously played for the Dewsbury Rams and the Batley Bulldogs.

References

External links
Sheffield Eagles profile
Dewsbury Rams profile
Jamaica profile

1994 births
Living people
Batley Bulldogs players
Dewsbury Rams players
English people of Jamaican descent
English rugby league players
Jamaica national rugby league team players
Newcastle Thunder players
Rugby league second-rows
Sheffield Eagles players